Orbus Terrarum (stylized as Orbvs Terrarvm) is a studio album by English electronic music group The Orb that was released on 20 March 1995 by Island Records. Member Kris Weston had begun work on the album before leaving the group. After he left, German producer Thomas Fehlmann joined as a full-time studio member, and the group, now consisting of Alex Paterson, Andy Hughes, and Fehlmann, completed the album. Unlike their previous efforts, Orbus Terrarum features more "earthbound", "organic" sounds in contrast to the psychedelic, science fiction-themed music they had previously written.

According to Paterson, Orbus Terrarum suffered "a good kicking" at the hands of the British music press. The Times described it as "generic ambient music" and The Guardian said it was a low point for Paterson's creativity. The album's sound alienated much of the group's fanbase, as had the group's preceding 1994 mini-album Pomme Fritz. Rolling Stone gave the album a more positive reception: naming it their album of the month, and citing its symphonic flow coupled with The Orb's "uniquely British wit".  The record reached number 20 on the UK Albums Chart.

Track listing

References

External links

1995 albums
The Orb albums
Island Records albums